USS Helori (SP-181), later YP-181, was an armed motorboat that served in the United States Navy as a patrol vessel from 1917 to 1922.

Helori was built as a civilian motorboat of the same name in 1911 by Johnson Brothers and Blanchard at Seattle, Washington, for use as a pleasure craft. The U.S. Navy purchased her from her owner, either Omar J. Humphrey  or H. G. Kenney of Seattle, on 23 April 1917 for World War I service as a patrol vessel. She was commissioned as USS Helori (SP-181) on 21 May 1917 at Puget Sound Navy Yard, Bremerton, Washington.

Assigned to the 13th Naval District, Helori was the only section patrol boat on the United States West Coast fitted with the 220-horsepower (0.3-megawatt) standard gasoline engine adopted for use in World War I submarine chasers, and she operated out of Puget Sound Navy Yard training engine room crews for submarine chasers and performing guardship duty. She made frequent trips to and from Bremerton and Seattle.

In 1920, Helori was reclassified from section patrol craft to district patrol craft and was redesignated YP-181

Helori was decommissioned in March 1922 and sold to the Crowley Launch and Tugboat Company of San Francisco, California, on 17 September 1925.

Notes

References

Department of the Navy: Naval Historical Center: Online Library of Selected Images: U.S. Navy Ships: USS Helori (SP-181, later YP-181), 1917-1925. Previously the civilian motor boat Helori (1911)
NavSource Online: Section Patrol Craft Photo Archive YP-181 ex-Helori (SP 181)

Patrol vessels of the United States Navy
World War I patrol vessels of the United States
Ships built in Seattle
1911 ships